Episode One: Children of Harlem is an album by saxophonist Gary Bartz which was recorded in 1994 and released on the Dutch Challenge label.

Reception

Scott Yanow of Allmusic said "Bartz (who is heard on alto and soprano) is in fine form playing with a top-notch quartet ... The hard-bop oriented music includes a few standards and three originals by either Bartz or Willis. It's not essential but enjoyable".

Track listing 
 "Amos 'n' Andy Theme One & Spoken Intro" (William Campbell) – 3:08
 "Tap Dancer" (Gary Bartz) – 7:01
 "If This Isn't Love" (Burton Lane, Yip Harburg) – 10:39
 "Tico Tico" (Zequinha de Abreu) – 8:45
 "Ezekiel Saw the Wheel" (Traditional) – 8:53
 "Children of Harlem" (Larry Willis) – 7:35
 "Crazy She Calls Me" (Carl Sigman, Bob Russell) – 12:55
 "Heavy Blue" (Larry Willis) – 5:12
 "Ruby Begonia & Amos 'n' Andy Theme Two" (Gaetano Braga) – 1:29

Personnel 
Gary Bartz – alto saxophone
Larry Willis – piano
Buster Williams - bass
Ben Riley - drums

References 

Gary Bartz albums
1994 albums
Challenge Records (1994) albums